The GE Dash 9-40CW is a  diesel-electric locomotive built by GE Transportation Systems of Erie, Pennsylvania, between January 1996 and December 2004. 1,090 were built for Norfolk Southern Railway, as road numbers 8889 to 9978. 53 GE Dash 8-44CWs built to Dash 9 specifications were also built for CSX Transportation, carrying road numbers 9000 to 9052.

Part of GE's "Dash 9" series of locomotives, the Dash 9-40CW shares its frame, HiAd trucks, 16-cylinder 7FDL engine, and 752AH-31 traction motors with the GE Dash 9-44CW. The Dash 9-40CW was basically an extension of the previous order for the standard cab GE Dash 9-40C, built under the same premise that a lower power rating would prolong the life of the engine and use less fuel.  

Early production units built for CSX were designed with carbodies externally identical to the predecessor Dash 8-40CW with the first three units of the series also being built on Dash 8-40CW frames, and were designated C44-8W originally, as they were built as 4400 horsepower units before being downrated to 4000 horsepower. The CSX units were equipped with GSC ''Floating Bolster'' 3 Trucks instead of the standard Hi-ad trucks commonly found on later models.

In 2005, GE replaced the C40-9W in its locomotive catalog with the Evolution Series model, the ES40DC. The change in output is accomplished electronically; mechanically, the two models are essentially the same.

BB40-9W 
GE also produced a narrow-gauge version of the Dash 9-40CW, known as the BB40-9W. All 141 examples of this locomotive are owned by the EFVM railroad in Brazil. They are equipped with four type B trucks, two at each end replacing the conventional type C trucks. This is necessary because EFVM tracks are  narrow gauge. Unlike the North American axle load limit of 71,500 lb (32.4 tonnes) on standard gauge railways, the narrow gauge railway over which the units operate allows only 51190 lb (25 tonnes). The units are numbered 1113 to 1253.

References

 

Dash 9-40CW
C-C locomotives
Diesel-electric locomotives of the United States
Freight locomotives
Norfolk Southern Railway locomotives
Standard gauge locomotives of the United States
Railway locomotives introduced in 1996

ja:GE Dash 9シリーズ